Galatasaray SK Men's 1968–1969 season is the 1968–1969 basketball season for Turkish professional basketball club Galatasaray SK.

Depth chart

Regular season

Pts=Points, Pld=Matches played, W=Matches won, L=Matches lost, F=Points for, A=Points against

Matches

1st Half

2nd Half

Galatasaray won the league.

Turkish Cup

İstanbul Qualification Tour

Samsun Semi-final Tour

Turkish Cup Final

FIBA European Champions Cup

References

 Milliyet Newspaper Archives 1968-1969

1969
Galatasaray Sports Club 1968–69 season